Kosów  is a village in the administrative district of Gmina Moszczenica, within Piotrków County, Łódź Voivodeship, in central Poland.

The village has a population of 648.

References

External links
 Fire Rescue Squad Kosów  

Villages in Piotrków County